Peter Donovan McEntee, CMG (27 June 1920 – 30 July 2002) was a British colonial administrator and diplomat. He was Governor of Belize from 1976 to 1980.. 

Peter was educated at Haileybury and served during World War Two in the King's African Rifles (Major) in Kenya, Abyssinia, Madagascar and Burma. After the war he ran the Company Commander's wing of the Combined School of Infantry, Nakuru. He served in Kenya as district officer, Embu from 1946, then district commissioner in Kapenguna and Marsebit, Municipal African Affairs Officer, Mombasa, Assistant Secretary, Chief Secretary's Office, Nairobi, Replacement Officer in Nakuru and Thika Districts and in Thompsons Falls. He then returned to the Secretariat at Nairobi and finally took control of Central Nyanza District before taking the post of African Courts Officer, 1960-1963. He worked in the Foreign and Commonwealth Office, 1963, then moved to Lagos, Nigeria, where he served as First Secretary (Internal), 1964-1967. Returning to London, he worked from 1967 to 1972 as a desk officer at the Foreign and Commonwealth Office and an assistant at the Commonwealth Relations Department. He was Consul General,arachi, Pakistan, 1972-1975, and Governor and Commander-in-Chief, Belize, 1976-1980. After his retirement, he served as Vice-Chairman of the Royal Commonwealth Society for the Blind, and, from 1993, Chairman of the Council of the Royal Overseas League. 

In 1945 he married Mary Elisabeth Sherwood, with whom he had two daughters, Carol and Bridget.

References 

 https://www.ukwhoswho.com/view/10.1093/ww/9780199540891.001.0001/ww-9780199540884-e-25591
 https://archiveshub.jisc.ac.uk/search/archives/73037dca-11b2-310b-ab47-69f5eb7f7c1e

1920 births
2002 deaths
Companions of the Order of St Michael and St George
British expatriates in Belize